Treponema vincentii is a species of Treponema. It is implicated as a pathogen in chronic periodontitis which can induce bone loss. This motile bacillus is a spirochaete.

It was previously known as Borrelia vincentii (Blanchard, 1906).

References

vincentii